Alejandro Penzini Pinedo (born 23 April 1993) is a Venezuelan footballer who plays predominantly as a defender for the New York Cosmos B, however he is competent playing in any position.

Career statistics

Club

Notes

References

External links
 Alejandro Penzini at St. John's University
 Alejandro Penzini at Adelphi University

1993 births
Living people
Venezuelan footballers
Venezuelan expatriate footballers
Association football defenders
Association football midfielders
Association football forwards
Westchester Flames players
New York Cosmos B players
Venezuelan expatriate sportspeople in the United States
Expatriate soccer players in the United States